SegaSoft, originally headquartered in Redwood City, California and later San Francisco, was a joint venture by Sega and CSK (Sega's majority stockholder at the time), created in 1995 to develop and publish games for the PC and Sega Saturn, primarily in the North American market.

In 1996, SegaSoft announced that they would be publishing games for all viable platforms, not just Saturn and PC. This, however, never came to fruition, as in January 1997 SegaSoft restructured to focus on the PC and online gaming.

SegaSoft disbanded in 2000 and many of the staff members were merged into Sega.com, a new company established to handle Sega's online presence in the United States.

SegaSoft was responsible for, among other things, the Heat.net multiplayer game system and publishing the last few titles made by Rocket Science Games.

Published games
Incomplete List
 10Six
 Alien Race
 Bug Too!
 Cosmopolitan Virtual Makeover 
 Cosmopolitan Virtual Makeover 2
 Da Bomb
 Emperor of the Fading Suns
 Essence Virtual Makeover
 Fatal Abyss
 Flesh Feast
 Golf: The Ultimate Collection
 Lose Your Marbles
 Grossology
 Mr. Bones
 Net Fighter
 Obsidian
 Plane Crazy
 Puzzle Castle
 Rocket Jockey
Science Fiction: The Ultimate Collection
 Scud: The Disposable Assassin
 Scud: Industrial Evolution
 The Space Bar
 Three Dirty Dwarves
 Trampoline-Fractured Fairy Tales: A Frog Prince
 Vigilance

Cancelled games
G.I. Ant
Heat Warz
Ragged Earth
 Sacred Pools
 Skies

Heat.net
Heat.net, stylized HEAT.NET, was an online PC gaming system produced by SegaSoft and launched in 1997 during Bernie Stolar's tenure as SEGA of America president. Heat.net hosted both Sega-published first- and second-party games, as well as popular third-party games of the era, such as Quake II and Baldur's Gate. Much like Kali, it also allowed users to play any IPX network-compatible game, regardless of whether or not it was designed for the Internet. Each supported game had its own chat lobby and game creation options. In addition, players could add friends and chat privately with them. Heat.net and its sister service, SEGANet, are considered ahead of their time and precursors to both Xbox Live and PlayStation Network.

Heat.net essentially combined the network, client, and protocol technologies of the MPlayer system (obtained under license) with the IPX tunneling package Kahn. However, the client software eliminated the Voxware voice features, as SegaSoft's engineers found that most bugs in the MPlayer software were in the voice module. Heat.net branded itself as a peaceful alternative to real-world violence with advertising slogans such as "Total peace through cyberviolence" and "Kill pixels not people."

It featured a currency system where the player earned "degrees" through playing games, trivia contests (both game-related and general), viewing ads, or other actions. Degrees could be spent, but only by premium members, at Heat.net's online store, the Black Market, which had computer games and related merchandise. On May 6, 1999, SEGA announced it had partnered with Chips & Bits' online game superstore which allowed players a vast selection of games, hardware and even magazine subscriptions.

The degree system was highly flawed and non-active players could leave their PCs logged into servers and earn degrees. Rooms were established for idle players to sit and earn degrees. Heat.net established "parking police" to discover these servers but players discovered other ways to falsely earn points.

Other features included tracking of user rankings on individual profile pages. Heat.net had a loyalty program, in which members, known as "Foot Soldiers", received shirts and Heat.net dog tags.

Heat.net was also the home a collegiate gaming league called HeatCIGL (College Internet Game League). Students from 1,100 registered schools would play Quake II or Unreal Tournament in teams representing their colleges, with play-offs at the end of the season.  The championship team received $5,000. The league also gave away a $5,000 "Excellence in Gaming" College Scholarship.

In September 2000, it was announced that Heat.net and HeatCIGL would be shutting down on October 31, 2000.

In June 2008, CNET hailed Heat.net as one of the greatest defunct websites in history.

Partial list of games supported on Heat.Net 
 Sega-published titles
 10SIX
 Fatal Abyss
 Flesh Feast
 Flying Heroes
 Net Fighter
 Plane Crazy
 Scud: Industrial Evolution
 Vigilance
 Third-Party Titles
 Age of Empires
 Age of Empires II
 Age of Wonders
 Army Men
 Army Men II
 Baldur's Gate
 Battlezone
 Blood (video game)
 Blood II: The Chosen
 Commandos: Behind Enemy Lines
 Commandos: Beyond the Call of Duty
 Darkstone
 DeathDrome
 Descent
 Diablo
 Duke Nukem 3D
 Get Medieval
 Grand Theft Auto
 Grand Theft Auto II
 Heroes of Might and Magic III
 Hexen II
 Kingpin: Life of Crime
 MechWarrior 2: 31st Century Combat
 NAM
 Postal
 Quake
 Quake II
 Quake III: Arena
 Railroad Tycoon II
 Red Alert
 Redneck Rampage
 Redline
 Requiem: Avenging Angel
 Sin
 Star Trek: Starfleet Academy
 Take No Prisoners
 Total Annihilation
 Total Annihilation: Kingdoms
 Unreal Tournament
 Uprising: Join or Die
 Uprising 2: Lead and Destroy
 Warbreeds
 Warcraft II: Tides of Darkness
 Warlords III: Reign of Heroes
 WWII GI

References

External links 
 Official Website (ARCHIVED)
 SegaSoft at GameFAQs
 SegaSoft at MobyGames
 SegaSoft at IGN
 Photos of the SegaSoft team at E3
 More information about HeatCIGL

Sega divisions and subsidiaries
Defunct companies based in California
Video game companies established in 1995
Internet properties established in 1995
Video game companies disestablished in 2000
Defunct websites
Online video game services
Defunct video game companies of the United States
Video game development companies
1995 establishments in California
2000 disestablishments in California